Ryuthela is a spider genus in the family Liphistiidae. This genus, as well as their closest relatives, Heptathela, formed when land masses from present-day Japan separated from the rest of Asia, forming islands in the late Miocene. Speciation of Ryuthela and Heptathela also occurred during this time, because of the further separation of islands, causing allopatric speciation.

Species list
 Ryuthela iheyana Ono, 2002 — Ryukyu Islands
 Ryuthela ishigakiensis Haupt, 1983 — Ryukyu Islands
 Ryuthela nishihirai (Haupt, 1979) — Okinawa
 Ryuthela sasakii Ono, 1997 — Ryukyu Islands
 Ryuthela tanikawai Ono, 1997 — Ryukyu Islands

See also
 List of Liphistiidae species

References

External links

Liphistiidae
Mesothelae genera
Spiders of Asia